Larson Crag is a prominent rocky summit, over  high, at the north end of the Staten Island Heights in the Convoy Range, Antarctica.

References

Cliffs of Victoria Land
Scott Coast